Arthur Crompton Moore (3 October 1877 - 5 October 1954) was  Archdeacon of Norfolk from 1934 until his death.
 
Moore was educated at Liverpool College, Clare College, Cambridge and Wycliffe Hall, Oxford. He served curacies in Knutsford, Seville, Huddersfield and Stockport. He held incumbencies at Potter Heigham, Halesworth and Hereford.

He died on 5 October 1954.

Notes

1877 births

1954 deaths

20th-century English Anglican priests

Archdeacons of Norfolk
People educated at Liverpool College
Alumni of Clare College, Cambridge
Alumni of Wycliffe Hall, Oxford